Taenaris phorcas is a butterfly of the subfamily Morphinae in the family Nymphalidae.

Subspecies
Subspecies include: 
Taenaris phorcas phorcas (Bismarck Archipelago - Solomon Islands)
Taenaris phorcas uranus Staudinger, 1888 (Bismarck Archipelago - Crown Island)
Taenaris phorcas admiralitatis Rothschild, 1916 (Admiralty Islands)

Distribution
This species can be found in the Solomon Islands and Bismarck Archipelago.

Description
The upperside of the wings contains large white blotches, with broad brown edges and a wide eyespot surrounded with yellow orange located in the white area of the hindwings. The underside of the hindwings shows an outer angle completely brown and a wide patch with two large black eyespots surrounded with yellow orange. The abdomen is brown.

Biology
Larvae of this species feed on Dracaena species.

References

Taenaris
Butterflies described in 1851